The AAA Contest Board was the motorsports arm of the American Automobile Association. The contest board sanctioned automobile races from 1904 until 1955, establishing of Championship Car racing. Modern-day IndyCar racing traces its roots directly to these AAA events.

All of the races at the Indianapolis Motor Speedway during that time period were sanctioned by AAA, including the Indianapolis 500. AAA sanctioned the 1905 National Motor Car Championship, the first national championship for major auto racing. It sanctioned the National Championship in 1916, and then from 1920 to 1955. It also sanctioned the Vanderbilt Cup.

The AAA Contest Board dissolved and decided to focus strictly on helping the automobiling public, as a result of the 1955 Le Mans disaster.

History
AAA was established in Chicago, Illinois on 4 March 1902. By June the same year, AAA also established the Racing Board. Arthur Rayner Pardington was appointed chairman and the board sanctioned its first race, the 1904 Vanderbilt Cup held in Long Island, New York. It is unclear as to why William Vanderbilt had AAA sanction his race as opposed to the Automobile Club of America, the predominant sanctioning body for major U.S. racing at the time.

With the success of the racing board's experience sanctioning automobile events in 1904, the board announced a national track championship for 1905. The National Motor Car Championship was the first time in American racing history that a points system was used to officially decide an annual champion. From 1906 through 1915 the racing board, inexplicably, recognized no official championship seasons. It did, however, continue to sanction numerous individual events, the Vanderbilt Cup and events at the Indianapolis Motor Speedway.

In 1908, the Automobile Club of America (ACA) created the American Grand Prize, the first traces of Grand Prix style racing in the U.S. along with the then established Vanderbilt Cup. This race started a feud between the ACA and AAA. Later in 1908 it was decided that AAA would sanction all big time racing nationally and the ACA would sanction all international events held on American soil. On 2 December 1908, AAA dissolved the Racing Board and created the Contest Board soon after. Though the rationale for this decision has been lost with time, the move was most likely done to allow AAA to oversee all automobile events and not just racing contests.

The Manufacturers Contest Association (MCA) urged AAA to organize racing so American manufacturers could race mostly stock configuration cars and ban the pure race cars being imported from Europe. The stock car style rules continued until 1916, when the Contest Board relaxed the rules allowing purpose built machines back into competition ahead of its next officially recognized championship season in 1916. Although AAA did not award national champions during 1906 through 1915, the American automobile journal Motor Age published who they regarded the most outstanding American driver during the years of 1909–1915. These picks have become de facto national champions of the day.

During World War I, AAA suspended the national championship and almost stopped sanctioning races as a whole. This time also saw the demise of the American Grand Prize and the ACA totally folded during the war. American manufacturers saw the absence of European racers, and the relaxed rules due to no national level sanctioning as a chance for the U.S. to catch up to the European racers who had dominated racing internationally up until that point. The Contest Board picked up the pieces and regularly held national championships from 1920 until the outbreak of World War II in 1941.

After World War I, the race car specifications for the national championship were mostly aligned with what the Indianapolis Motor Speedway wanted to run during its Memorial Day classic, and this still holds mostly true today. AAA, again, restarted the championship with the close of the war for the 1946 season and continued uninterrupted through 1955. After that season, AAA completely pulled out of auto racing, citing the Le Mans disaster and the death of Bill Vukovich at Indianapolis as contributing factors. The Indianapolis Motor Speedway and other Midwestern promoters formed a "Temporary Emergency Committee," later known as the United States Auto Club, to replace the AAA.  At the international level, the Automobile Competition Committee of the United States replaced the AAA Contest Board as the national sporting authority per FIA. During the last half of the Racing Boards existence they sanctioned many forms of racing such as midgets, sprint cars, sports cars and stock cars as well as top level championship car racing.

National Championship results

Contemporary publication selections

Controversy
Between the years of 1902 and 1919, although AAA sanctioned many races, an official national championship was only awarded in 1905 and 1916. On two separate occasions, Contest Board record keepers changed the results of certain seasons, and calculated retrospective national championships for years in which one was not awarded. These actions have made it difficult to distinguish fact from fiction regarding AAA sanctioned national racing.

Retrospectively awarded champions 
In 1927 Arthur Means, the Assistant Secretary of the AAA Contest Board, with the approval of Secretary Val Haresnape, retrospectively calculated championship results for major AAA-sanctioned races run between 1909 and 1915 and for 1917 to 1920. The pair also initially changed the 1920 championship winner to Tommy Milton, but by no later than 1929 had restored Gaston Chevrolet.

In 1951 Russ Catlin officially revised AAA records with results based on all AAA races from 1902 to 1919, and first published his list in the 1952 Indianapolis 500 program. Using his own devised system of awarding championship points, this had the effect of retroactively creating seven new champions and changing the 1909 champion from Bert Dingley to George Robertson and the 1920 champion from Gaston Chevrolet to Tommy Milton. IndyCar currently recognizes Russ Catlin's list from 1909 to 1919, but with Gaston Chevrolet as champion for 1920.

Each year from 1909 to 1915 and in 1919, the American automobile journal Motor Age selected a "driver of the year". Likewise, other contemporary publications such as The Horseless Age, MoToR, The New York Times, and Los Angeles Times made similar selections.

All retrospectively awarded championships named by Haresnape & Means and Catlin are unequivocally considered unofficial by accredited historians and statisticians. Furthermore, some consider them revisionist history, and discredit the entire effort made by both parties as illegitimate, unnecessary, fictional, and not consistent with contemporary accounts. These actions have made it difficult to distinguish fact from fiction regarding AAA sanctioned national racing in that proper handbooks and official statistical supplement still partially intermix the revisionist accounts with official record.

 Harsnape and Means originally awarded the 1920 championship to Milton, but subsequently reverted to Chevrolet.

See also
American Automobile Association
American Championship Car Racing

 United States Auto Club
 Sports Car Club of America
 Automobile Racing Club of America

References

Open wheel racing
American Automobile Association
1902 establishments in the United States
1955 disestablishments in the United States
Organizations established in 1902
Organizations disestablished in 1955